KD Badik is the third ship of Keris-class littoral mission ship of the Royal Malaysian Navy. She was built at Wucang Port, Qidong, Shanghai, in China by China Shipbuilding and Offshore International Co. Ltd. Badik was commissioned on 22 October 2021 and in service with the 11th LMS Squadron based in Sepanggar, Sabah.

Development
Badik was launched on 15 April 2019 in China and its Physical Hand Over (PHO) ceremony was held at the Wuchang Shipyard in Qidong, China on 14 September 2021. She was commissioned on 22 October 2021.

References

2019 ships
Keris-class littoral mission ships
Ships built in China